A mini-grid is an aggregation of loads and one or more energy sources operating as a single system providing electric power and possibly heat isolated from a main power grid. A modern mini-grid may include renewable and fossil fuel-based generation, energy storage, and load control. A mini grid can be fully isolated from the main grid (wide area synchronous grid) or interconnected to it. If it is interconnected to the main grid, it must also be able to isolate (“island”) from the main grid and continue to serve its customers while operating in an island or autonomous mode. Mini-grids are used as a cost-effective solution for electrifying rural communities where a grid connection is challenging in terms of transmission and cost for the end user population density, with mini grids often used to electrify rural communities of a hundred or more households that are 10 km or more from the main grid.

Mini grids and microgrids are similar, and the terms are sometimes used as synonyms. Both microgrids and mini grids include generation and distribution, and generally include electricity storage in the form of electrochemical batteries. Both can “island” in the event of a blackout or other disturbance or – common in mini grids – in the case that they were never connected to the main grid in the first place. In practice, the term “mini grid” is used more in a context common in low- and middle-income countries providing electricity to communities that were previously unelectrified, or sometimes used to provide reliable electricity in areas in which the national grid is present but where electricity is sporadic; across Sub-Saharan Africa, more than half of households connected to the main grid reported receiving electricity less than half of the time. The African Mini Grid Developers Association (AMDA) reports that uptimes of mini grids of its members for which data was available averaged 99% across countries. In contrast, the term “microgrid” is used more in higher income countries to refer to systems that provide very high levels of reliability (for example, “five nines” or 99.999%) for critical loads like data centers, hospitals, corporate campuses or military bases generally in service areas that already have high levels of reliability (e.g. “three nines” or 99.9% reliability) by global standards.

Background

History 
The electric grids of many developed, high-income countries once started out as mini-grids. These isolated electrical systems were then connected and integrated into a larger grid. This first generation of mini grids was pivotal to the early development and industrialization of most modern economies, including Brazil, China, Denmark, Italy, the Netherlands, Spain, Sweden, the United Kingdom, and the United States. Mini grid systems introduced in the late nineteenth and early twentieth centuries can be described as the first generation of mini grids. Starting in the 1980s and ramping up through the 1990s and early 2000s, a second generation of mini grids numbering in the tens of thousands was deployed in many low-income countries. These systems are typically small and isolated, powered by diesel or hydropower, and built by local communities or entrepreneurs primarily to provide rural households with access to electricity, especially in areas not yet served by the main grid. Many of these systems were overtaken by the national grids. Some that still exist are now prime candidates for hybridization with solar photovoltaic (PV) systems to reduce the fuel cost.

Rural electrification 

Many rural communities remain isolated from larger, traditional grids due to geographic and economic constraints. The electrification of the global off-grid rural population remains a major task of many developing and developed countries, and according to the International Energy Agency in the 2013 World Energy Outlook, mini-grids represent the most cost-effective way to provide universal electricity access to these populations. Due to new technology innovations that have resulted in declining costs both for mini-grids and energy generation sources, specifically solar and wind power, mini-grids have the potential to electrify remote areas that would otherwise remain outside of a grid connection. Mini-grids are a cost-effective and timely solution for more isolated areas in which connection to the main electric grid is unavailable, and represent a practical option for meeting the energy demand in Sub‐Saharan Africa, South and East Asia, and Small Island Developing States.

Millions of people remain without access to electricity today, and the U.N. Sustainable Development Goals commit the global community to provide a solution. The map on the right demonstrates energy disparity between developed countries such as the US, China, and Europe while South America, Africa, and Southeast Asia still have many communities that lack reliable, sustainable, affordable energy. Mini-grids are currently being viewed as one of the most effective solutions to bringing energy to rural populations where the energy demands are such that individual stand-alone systems such as nano-grids are impractical but where the population is large enough to require a larger grid system. Because a grid must balance the supply of energy with the demand, the mini-grid's larger size and flexibility allows for safer and more affordable power.

Technical components

Generation 
A vital component of a mini-grid electric system is on-site, reliable source of energy generation. Traditional mini-grid generation for remote areas came from diesel engine alternators, which incurred high running costs, low efficiency and high maintenance. To obtain the reliability of a fossil fuel powered grid with greater sustainability, hybrid energy systems can be used to integrate renewable energy technologies with diesel generators, batteries, and inverters. The main concern with generation is the fluctuation in load demand that imposes varied power requirements from the generation system. These fluctuations can vary throughout a single day, from day to day, or even on the scale of weeks to months, which necessitates flexible mini-grid generation. In the case of limited power generation without a source of energy storage, peak loads can demand more power than the mini-grid generation is capable of supplying, which results in brownouts or blackouts.

Energy sources 
There exist a variety of energy sources to provide on-side power to a mini-grid system. Recent developments to renewables provide a lucrative option due to the low cost and sustainable economic and environmental nature. As an example, the energy cost of solar PV decreased from $4/W to $0.55–$0.65/W between 2007 and 2016.

Common sources of mini-grid generation 

 Solar photovoltaic
 Wind power
 Hydropower
 Biomass
 Traditional fuel generators
 Hybrid systems
 Marine energy

Energy storage 
Because of the intermittent nature of renewable energy sources, generators, fuel cells, or batteries are required to ensure the reliability of Mini-grid Renewable Energy Systems (MRES). Otherwise, communities relying on real-time generation experience power outages when renewable generation is not possible. Due to fluctuation in load demand, the energy storage system must be able to meet the peak demand, which can entail large and expensive battery or fuel cell systems. To balance cost with sustainability, energy storage can be combined with diesel power and introduced to a mini-grid in a series or switched hybrid system.

Hybrid system 
Hybrid mini-grid systems are a popular option to ensure mini-grid reliability, especially when considering renewable energy sources. A hybrid mini-grid is identified by diversified Distributed Energy Resources (DERs), where the energy generation comes from a variety of sources such as solar PV, micro-hydro power plants, wind turbines, biomass, and small conventional generators.

Series hybrid systems have both a renewable energy source and a diesel generator which are used in conjunction to maintain the charge of a battery bank, which is then converted to AC and fed to the load. This system allows for simple implementation, but has low efficiency and requires large battery capacity. In contrast, switched hybrid systems enable renewable energy plus storage to supply the baseload power supply while the diesel generator helps meet peak energy demand.

Distribution 
A mini-grid distribution system carries the energy produced by the generation source to the end users. It consists of transmission lines, transformers, and the infrastructure necessary to enable safe and effective energy distribution. Depending on the load requirements, a distribution system can be in AC or DC single or three phase power. AC has many benefits, as it allows for effective electricity transmission over distances, meets the requirements for consumer appliances, and is more widely used. However, AC also requires transformers to decrease high voltage distribution network costs and decrease system loss, but is also generally more expensive than DC because of the enhanced power electronics.

Smart Mini-grid 
A Smart Mini-Grid (SMG) is an intelligent electricity distribution network that manages the various technical components of a mini-grid system. Often coupled with hybrid power generation, the smart mini-grid operates using smart controllers and advanced control techniques, accommodating various energy sources, energy storage, and distribution. The smart mini-grid relies on a management system which allows for the measurement, monitoring, and control of electric loads and can be coupled with automation to allow for remote operation, smart metering, load shedding, and optimized performance. Another key component is self healing, or the ability for the smart mini-grid to detect, respond, and restore itself immediately in case of disturbances or changes to the system.

Benefits 
There are many potential benefits of mini-grids ranging from technical and environmental to social and financial advantages. Mini-grids can be used in rural areas and are often more efficient and cost-effective than other types of power systems. They can also strengthen the community while having less impact on the environment.

Technical benefits 
The technology used in mini-grids provides various benefits. Mini-grids are relatively quick and easy to implement in areas without electricity. They can also be used to improve existing electrical grids that are ineffective or unreliable by providing additional power or by replacing them completely. Mini-grids are also more efficient because they can provide a low load at night when less electricity is needed. Unlike conventional energy generation, mini-grids reduce the energy lost at night time when less energy is required by the community. Larger electrical systems such as diesel generators cannot offer this because they are inefficient at low loads and most often continue operating at higher loads regardless of the amount of electricity needed. The use of mini-grids also decreases the amount of time the generators are run at low loads thereby increasing efficiency of the entire system.

An additional benefit mini-grids provide is that they do no require a traditional fuel source as many larger scale electric grids do. This means they can be easily implemented in areas without access to diesel or other fossil fuels. This reduces operating costs and reliance on often fluctuating fuel prices. Mini-grids also require less maintenance than larger electrical grids. Since they reduce the hours that diesel generators are used at low loads, generators last longer and do not need to be replaced as often. Because of the rural areas where mini-grids are typically used, there is often little access to supplies or technicians if system maintenance is needed.

Financial benefits 
Other than the reduced cost of fuel, mini-grids offer other financial advantages. Mini-grids can be run by a combination of energy sources, which means they have a lower levelized cost of electricity. Mini-grids are also able to spread electrical storage across many users which reduces the cost when compared to off-grid or solar home systems where electrical storage is concentrated in one area. Mini-grids are also more profitable than other types of electric grids. Due to their improved electrical services and decreased malfunctions such as blackouts, customers are more satisfied overall, and thus willing to pay for the services mini-grids provide, leading to an increase in revenue.

Environmental benefits 
Mini-grids are much more environmentally friendly than other types of grids. Since they reduce the need for diesel generators, greenhouse gas emissions are greatly reduced. This also improves air and noise pollution in the areas mini-grids are used.

Social benefits 
In addition to their technical and economic advantages, mini-grids also benefit the people and communities they serve. In order for many businesses and organizations to function, they must have working and efficient electricity. Mini-grids provide the necessary services for businesses to succeed in developing areas. This leads to the creation of more jobs and an increase in income for the community. Improved electricity can also benefit healthcare technology and institutions in the areas and lead to a higher standard of living. The electricity mini-grids provide also allows for more opportunities for social gatherings and events which strengthen the community. Improved electricity also creates the opportunity to construct more buildings and expand the community.

Risks 
Although mini-grids have many benefits, there are also some drawbacks. There are some risks associated with their technology and organization as well as risks to the community they are implemented in.

Technical risks 
One of the main technical risks associated with mini-grids is the load uncertainty. It is often difficult to estimate the load size, growth, and schedule which can lead to the system running with lower efficiency and higher cost. It is also difficult to support loads that are constantly changing over time, as they typically are when using mini-grids. There is also a risk to power quality when using mini-grids. Integrating photovoltaic devices and batteries can be disruptive to the existing grid and can cause it to become unstable. Another technical drawback of using mini-grids is that failure of hardware in one part of the grid could affect the entire system. If one section if the grid is damaged, the rest of the grid could fail as well. This is a risk that exists with any type of grid, however the regions where mini-grids are typically used are poor rural areas with less access to maintenance services so the effects are exacerbated. While helpful for energy storage, the batteries used in mini-grids also have risks of their own. They are usually expensive and as they age they have a large influence on the energy that is supplied to the grid. If the batteries are not replaced at the correct time, the energy provided by the whole grid could be decreased.

Organizational risks 
Because of their complex nature, there are a few organizational risks associated with using mini-grids. In order to be effective, mini-grids must have effective business models to support their operations. There needs to be a steady flow of revenue to keep the business up and running and in order to keep providing customers with electricity. Due to the remote and underdeveloped locations where mini-grids are typically implemented, it is difficult to transport supplies and skilled personnel to the areas they are needed. It is especially difficult when installing the system and when repairs are needed.

Social risks 
Implementing a mini-grid into a community takes meticulous planning and cooperation between the people living in the area as well as the technicians installing the devices. There also needs to be communication among the community with regards to allotted energy quotas. Each user is typically assigned an energy quota to be used over a certain amount of time. If some users over-consume the electricity, this leaves a deficit for the other users and could disrupt the entire system. The community must work in cooperation in order for the mini-grid to work successfully.

Economics 
Mini-grids provide communities with a reliable source of energy as well as many benefits to their economy. It is often too expensive for government electrical companies to attempt to bring electricity to undeveloped areas, and there is less potential for profit in these areas with poor economies. Since mini-grids can operate separately from the larger national grids, private companies can implement them and provide rural communities with electricity more quickly than state-owned companies.

In terms of market size, the consulting company Infinergia estimates that there around 2,000 solar mini-grids installed in Africa in 2018, expecting them to reach 16,000 by 2023. Likewise, the analyst estimates 5,000 of them in Asia in 2018, expecting them to reach 15,000 by 2023.

Case study 
A case study performed in the Leh District of India demonstrates the effects of mini-grids on the economy. Since the operational costs of mini-grids are less than those of diesel and hydro generators, the companies that run them are able to bring in more revenue. This increase in revenue means the companies can increase the salaries of their workers. In turn, the workers are able to spend more in the local businesses and the economy is allowed to grow. Furthermore, mini-grids provide opportunities for the local economy to grow and improve. Businesses can provide more and better services with improved electricity and expand their organizations.

References 

Electrical grid
Sustainable energy